Primien Manirafasha (born 4 November 1989) is a Rwandan long-distance runner.

In 2017, he competed in the senior men's race at the 2017 IAAF World Cross Country Championships held in Kampala, Uganda. He finished in 58th place.

References

External links 
 

Living people
1989 births
Place of birth missing (living people)
Rwandan male long-distance runners
Rwandan male cross country runners